Bidhi Chand Chhina (Gurmukhi: ਬਿਧੀ ਚੰਦ; 26 April 1579 – 30 August 1638 or 1640) was a Sikh religious preacher and military commander, from Chhina Bidhi Chand village, 37 kilometers south of Amritsar and Chhina Bidhi Chand was part of Amritsar District not Lahore.  His Birth Place temple is situated in his own village Chhina Bidhi Chand and building was built by the residents with the help of Baba Daya Singh . Baba Daya Singh laid foundation with his own hands. Every year on his (Baba Bidhi Chand) birthday Baba Daya Singh  now Baba Avtar Singh  go to village Chhina Bidhi Chand and celebrate it there to date.
He was a disciple of Guru Arjan and served Guru Hargobind for most of his life.

Biography

Early life 
His father may have been Hindal, a Sikh of Guru Amar Das. As a young man, Bidhi Chand was an inhabitant of the Sur Singh village of Lahore district and had fallen into bad company and taken to banditry. One day, a pious Sikh, Bhai Adali of the village of Chohia, led him into Guru Arjan Dev 's presence where he underwent a remarkable transformation. His life of banditry and misdeeds ended for he knew now wanted nothing more than life of dedication to the service of the Guru. He became a devotee of Guru Arjan.

Later life 
He was one of the five Sikhs chosen to accompany Guru Arjun on his journey to martyrdom at Lahore in 1606. On the death of his father, Guru Hargobind turned his thoughts to training and raising an army to resist the dangers that threatened the peace-loving Sikhs. He chose Baba Bidhi Chand to be one of the commanders of the Risaldari (cavalry) he was raising. Baba Bidhi Chand was the first ever commander in chief of cavalry who fought with Mughals in the absence of Guru Hargobind Sahib . Baba Bidhi Chand displayed great feats of valour in several battles with the Mughal troops.
Guru Hargobind Sahib  Blessed Baba Bidhi Chand  as saying (Bidhi Chand Chhina Guru Ka Seena) means Bidhi Chand is the Chest of Guru. He was one of the first four commanders of the Akal Sena, the first standing Sikh army which was started by Guru Hargobind.

Dilbagh and Gulbagh 

A Sikh sakhi narrates a story involving the recapture of two horses, which had been forcibly taken from the Sikhs by the Mughals, by Bidhi Chand. The horses had been seized as the owner, a Sikh who had raised and trained them, was bringing them from Kabul as an offering for the Guru in the company of two masands who had been dispatched to the local Sikh congregation of Kabul. Bidhi Chand was chosen as the best choice for the mission to recapture the prized horses, named Dilbagh and Gulbagh, from the hands of the Mughal emperor Shah Jahan. Bidhi Chand accomplished this task by becoming employed at the stable of the Lahore Fort where the horses were kept as the worker who brought the horses fresh grass to feed to the horses and their personal groomer, he used a false name of "Kasera" while he worked there. He stayed at the residence of a local Sikh named Jiwan during the time of his employment and he refused to accept the pay he was afforded by the officials. He eventually won the trust of the officials who were in-charge of guarding the fort after being employed there for some time. Every night, he would desensitize the guards to sounds coming from the Ravi River by throwing large rocks into it and tell them it was just a large animal, to mask his coming plan. Later on, he managed to escape with one of the horses, Dilbagh, by jumping into the Ravi River (whose course at that time flowed near the fort) at night when the guards were sound asleep after being fed a large feast under the patronage of Bidhi Chand on his payday. He brought the horse back to the encampment of the Guru.

However, this was only one of the horses, Dilbagh, and he still had to capture the other, Gulbagh. He returned to Lahore and was assisted by a local Sikh named Bhai Bohru. He managed to escape with the other horse by fooling the official caretaker of the horses, Sondha Khan, by disguising himself and pretending to be an astrologer investigating the disappearance of the first horse (which he had actually been the one who had stolen it). The horses were renamed by the Sikhs, with Dilbagh being renamed as Jan Bhai (meaning "as dear to life") and Gulbagh being renamed as Suhela (meaning "dear companion").

Missionary work 
Guru Hargobind instructed Bidhi Chand to travel to the eastern regions of the Indian subcontinent to act as a missionary to spread the teachings of the Sikh faith. At Deonagar (or Devnagar), he met Pir Sundar Shah, the disciple of Pir Budhan Shah, and the two developed a close bond. He also became close with Pir Budhan Shah. After the death of his master, Budhan Shah, Pir Sundar Shah visited Kiratpur where he petitioned Bidhi Chand to visit him at Deonagar once again, whom promised him that he shall fulfill this request within a month of his death as he refused to leave the side of his beloved Guru.

Death 
In the year 1638, Bidhi Chand departed from Kiratpur, where he left his son, Lal Chand, in the service of Guru Hargobind, and died at Deonagar (or Devnagar) while in a state of meditation, on the banks of the river Gomti. He died alongside his friend, Sundar Shah.

Legacy 
Many of Chand's swords and paintings are displayed in the museum of Gurdwara Sri Harmandir Sahib, located in Amritsar. A faction of Akali-Nihangs, named the Bidhi Chand Dal, is his namesake.

References

Further reading

Sikh warriors
1640 births
Year of death missing